The Texas Tech Red Raiders baseball program is a collegiate baseball team representing Texas Tech University. The team competes in the Big 12 Conference, a National Collegiate Athletic Association (NCAA) Division I athletic conference. The program has had 9 head coaches since it began play during the 1926 season.

In 1929, after only four seasons, the program was cut due to a lack of interest in college baseball. In 1953, Texas Tech head football coach and athletic director DeWitt Weaver suggested the program be revived to strengthen the athletic department as part of a push for Southwest Conference (SWC) membership. The following year, Beattie Feathers was hired to field the first  Texas Tech baseball team in 26 years. Since the 2013 season, Texas Tech alumnus Tim Tadlock has served as the Red Raiders' head coach.

Freeland, the first head coach, has the highest winning percentage of any Texas Tech baseball head coach with a 15–11 record (.673). (I think this is incorrect 15-11 is a .577 winning percentage).

Hays is the all-time leader in games coached (1295), total wins (479), total losses (479), total ties (3), conference wins (278), conference losses (271), and conference winning percentage (.506%).

Key

Coaches

Notes

References
General

Specific

Texas Tech Red Raiders

Red Raiders
Texas Tech Red Raiders baseball coaches